Hermann Senator (6 December 1834 – 14 July 1911) was a German internist who was a native of Gnesen in the Prussian Province of Posen (now Gniezno, Wielkopolska, Poland).

Of Jewish descent, he studied medicine in Berlin, where he received his medical doctorate in 1857. Among his instructors in Berlin were Johannes Peter Müller (1801-1858), Johann Lukas Schönlein (1793-1864) and Ludwig Traube (1818-1876). In 1875, he became chief physician in the internal medicine department at the Augusta-Hospital, and in 1881 became head physician at the Berlin Charité.

After the death of Friedrich Theodor von Frerichs (1819-1885), he served as head of the "first medical clinic" at Berlin for a few months. In 1888 his department at the Charité was made into the "third medical clinic", expanded and made a part of a policlinic with Senator as its director. Beginning in 1872 he was co-editor of "Centralblatt für die medizinischen Wissenschaften".

Hermann Senator made several contributions in internal medicine, in particular, involving research in the field of nephrology. He was the author of influential works associated with diabetes and albuminuria, and is credited with disproving the once-held belief that albuminuria was always a sign of primary kidney disease. His treatise on diseases of the kidneys, "Die Erkrankungen der Nieren", was included in Nothnagel's textbook of special pathology and therapy. Senator was also the author of a significant study on fevers, titled "Untersuchungen über den fieberhaften Process und seine Behandlung" (Investigations of the febrile process and its treatment).

In 1868 he introduced his theory of "autointoxication", of which he speculated that "self-infection" originating in the intestines could be a source of disease elsewhere in the human body. He also believed that autointoxication could be the root cause of certain mental disorders.

Selected publications 
 Untersuchungen über den fieberhaften Process und seine Behandlung. 
 Die Krankheiten des Bewegungsapparates. Diabetes mellitus und insipidus (Diseases of the musculoskeletal system. Diabetes mellitus and diabetes insipidus. Included in Hugo Wilhelm von Ziemssen's "Handbuch der speciellen Pathologie und Therapie". 2nd edition, 1879. 
 Die Albuminurie im gesunden und kranken Zustande. Berlin, A. Hirschwald, 1882, (Albuminuria in healthy and diseased states); translated into several foreign languages.   
 Die Erkrankungen der Nieren. (Diseases of the kidneys) In: Carl Wilhelm Hermann Nothnagel's "Handbuch der speciellen Pathologie und Therapie".
 "Diseases of kidney and the spleen, hemorrhagic diseases". Philadelphia, 1905, (with Moritz Litten and Alfred Stengel).

References

Sources

External links

 Hermann Senator @ Who Named It
 The World Journal of Biological Psychiatry

German people of Jewish descent
German nephrologists
19th-century German physicians
1834 births
1911 deaths
People from Gniezno